— Joyce Kilmer (1886–1918), "Trees", first published this year

— Gertrude Stein (1874–1946), from "Sacred Emily", written this year

Nationality words link to articles with information on the nation's poetry or literature (for instance, Irish or France).

Events
 January 8 – Harold Monro founds the Poetry Bookshop in London. American poets Robert Frost and Ezra Pound will eventually meet there.
June 2  -  Poet Laureate Alfred Austin dies, succeeded by Robert Bridges.
 September 8 – W. B. Yeats' poem "September 1913" is published in The Irish Times during the Dublin Lock-out.
 Ezra Pound travels to London to meet W. B. Yeats, whom he considers "the only poet worthy of serious study"; from that year until 1916, the two men winter in the Stone Cottage at Ashdown Forest, with Pound nominally acting as secretary to the older poet.
 January and March – Three poems of Hilda Doolittle appear in the January issue of Poetry: A Magazine of Verse, submitted by Ezra Pound, the magazine's "foreign editor" and a close associate of Doolittle. The March 1913 issue of the magazine also contained Pound's "A Few Don'ts by an Imagiste" and F. S. Flint's essay Imagisme. This publication history means that this London-based movement has its first readership in the United States.
 The New Freewoman, a literary magazine, begins publication in June but becomes defunct in December. Dora Marsden owns it; Rebecca West edits it at first, then Ezra Pound takes over as editor; it succeeds The Freewoman and will be succeeded by The Egoist.
 Founding of The Glebe a literary magazine edited by Alfred Kreymborg and Man Ray; it will cease publication in 1914 after 10 issues.
 Ezra Pound, having heard about The Glebe from Kreymborg's friend John Cournos, sends Kreymborg the manuscript of Des Imagistes in the summer and this famous first anthology of Imagism is published as the fifth issue of The Glebe.

 Jose Martínez Ruiz, commonly known as Azorín, comes up with the name "Generation of '98" this year, referring to the novelists, poets, essayists, and philosophers active in Spain at the time of the Spanish–American War (1898) and alluding to the moral, political, and social crisis produced by Spain's defeat in that war. Writing mostly after 1910, the group reinvigorates Spanish letters, revives literary myths and breaks with classical schemes of literary genres. In politics, members of the movement often justify radicalism and rebellion.
 Wallace Stevens and his wife, Elsie, rent a New York City apartment from sculptor Adolph Weinman, who makes a bust of Elsie, whose image later is used on the artist's 1916-1945 Mercury dime design.
 November 14 – Rabindranath Tagore is awarded the Nobel prize in literature.
 December 15 – Ezra Pound (in London) writes to James Joyce (in Trieste) requesting some of his recent poems for The Egoist.
 Norbert von Hellingrath begins publishing  Friedrich Hölderlin's complete works (Sämtliche Werke: historisch-kritische Ausgabe, the "Berliner Ausgabe"), restoring his work to literary prominence.

Works published in English

Canada
 Tom MacInnes, The Rhymes of a Rounder
 Marjorie Pickthall, The Drift of Pinions
 Varna Sheard, The Miracle and Other Poems
 Albert D. Watson, Love and the Universe, the Immortals and Other Poems

United Kingdom
 Laurence Binyon, Auguries
 Joseph Campbell, Irishry
 W. H. Davies, Foliage
 Walter de la Mare, Peacock Pie: a book of rhymes
 John Drinkwater, Cromwell, and Other Poems
 Radclyffe Hall, Songs of Three Counties, and Other Poems
 D. H. Lawrence, Love Poems and Others
 Richard Le Gallienne, The Lonely Dancer, and Other Poems, English poet living at this time in the United States
 Winifred Mary Letts, Songs from Leinster, English-born poet resident in Ireland
 John Masefield, Dauber
 Alfred Noyes, Tales of the Mermaid Tavern
 George William Russell ("Æ"), Collected Poems (expanded editions published in 1919, 1926 and 1935)
 Siegfried Sassoon, The Daffodil Murderer
 Dora Sigerson, Madge Linsey, and Other Poems
 J. C. Squire, The Three Hills, and Other Poems
 Rabindranath Tagore, ' 'The Crescent Moon' ', lyrics, translated mostly from Bengali; Indian poetry in English
 Katharine Tynan, Irish Poems, Irish poet published in the United Kingdom
 William Carlos Williams, The Tempers, the second book of poetry by this American poet; his friend, Ezra Pound arranged to have it published in the United Kingdom
 W. B. Yeats, Poems Written in Discouragement, Irish poet published in the United Kingdom

United States
 Witter Bynner, Tiger
 Robert Frost, A Boy's Will
 Paul Laurence Dunbar, Complete Poems, published posthumously
 John Gould Fletcher:
 Fire and Wine
 Fool's Gold
 The Book of Nature
 The Dominant City
 Visions of the Evening
 Joyce Kilmer, "Trees" first appears in the August issue of Poetry magazine, it was later included in Trees and Other Poems 1914
 Richard Le Gallienne, The Lonely Dancer, English poet living at this time in the United States
 Vachel Lindsay, General William Booth Enters into Heaven and Other Poems
 John Hall Wheelock, Love and Liberation
 William Carlos Williams, The Tempers, the second book of poetry by this American poet; his friend, Ezra Pound arranged to have it published in the United Kingdom.

Other in English
 Arthur Henry Adams, Collected Verses of Arthur H. Adams, Australia
 Rabindranath Tagore, ' 'The Crescent Moon' ', lyrics, translated mostly from Bengali; Indian poetry in English
 Katharine Tynan, Irish Poems Irish poet published in the United Kingdom
 W. B. Yeats, Poems Written in Discouragement, Irish poet published in the United Kingdom
 E. W. Cole, editor, Backblock Ballads and other Verses, front cover illustration by David Low; including a "Glossary: for the use of the thoroughly genteel", four sections of "The Sentimental Bloke" and "The Austral-aise", both by C. J. Dennis, Australian anthology<ref>"Dennis, Clarence Michael James (1876 - 1938)", article in Australian Dictionary of Biography, Online edition, retrieved May 11, 2009</ref>

Works published in other languages

France

 Guillaume Apollinaire, pen name of Wilhelm Apollinaris de Kostrowitzky, Alcools: Poemes 1898-1913, edited by Tristan Tzara; France
 Blaise Cendrars, La prose du Transsibérien et de la Petite Jehanne de France ("Prose of the Trans-Siberian and of Little Jehanne of France"), a collaborative artists' book with near abstract pochoir print by Sonia Delaunay-Terk
 Francis Jammes, Feuilles dans le vent Pierre Jean Jouve, Parler Valéry Larbaud, Les Poésies de A. O. Barnabooth Charles Péguy, ÈveIndian subcontinent
Including all of the British colonies that later became India, Pakistan, Bangladesh, Sri Lanka and Nepal. Listed alphabetically by first name, regardless of surname:

Assamese language
 Chandra Kumar Agarwala, Pratima Hiteshwar Bar Barua, Tirotav Atma Balidan Kavya, narrative poem about the sacrifice of Jaymoti Kunwari for the sake of her husband, Gadadhar Singha, ruler of Assam from 1681–1696
 Lakshminath Bezbarua, Kadam Kali, inspired by the ballads of Assam

Bengali language
 Adipudi Somanatharavu, translator, Gitanjali Bengali poems by Rabindranath Tagore translated into Telugu
 Chittaranjan Das, Sagar Sangit, Bengali language, short verses, intensely religious, later translated into English by Sri Aurobindo
 Pramatha Chaudhuri, Sanet Pancasat, India, Bengali language

Indian poetry in other languages
 K. C. Kesava Pillai, Kesaviyam, India, Malayalam language
 Kilabhai Ghansyam, Meghdut, translation into Gujarati from the original Sanskrit of Meghudutam by Kalidasa
 Mohammad Abdul Majid, Caman-i-benazir, Urdu language
 Raja Shyama Kumar Tagore, Jarmani Kavyam, Sanskrit language, a poem on Germany
 Ulloor S. Parameswara Iyer, Umakeralam, a mahakavya, a type of Indian epic poem, India, Malayalam language
 Vakil Ahmad Shah Qureshi, Om-nama (incorporating Ghazalyat-e-Shastri), Kashmiri language

Other languages
 Delmira Agustini, Los cálices vacíos, pórtico de Rubén Darío ("Empty chalices"), Uruguay
 Stefan George, Der Stern des Bundes ("The Star of the Order"), Germany
 Marie Heiberg, Luule ("Poems"), Estonia
 Emmy Hennings, Äthergedichte ("Ether poems"), Germany
 Vicente Huidobro, Canciones en la noche ("Songs in the Night"), Chile
 Blanche Lamontagne-Beauregard, Visions gaspésiennes, French language Canada
 Lionel Léveillé (writing under the pseudonym Englebert Gallèze), La claire fontaine, French language Canada
 Georg Trakl, Gedichte ("Poems"), Austrian published in Germany
 Nik Welter, Hochofen, Luxembourg published in Germany
 Vladimir Mayakovsky, I [Я], Russia

Births
Death years link to the corresponding "[year] in poetry" article:
 January 1 – Norman Rosten (died 1995), American poet, playwright and novelist
 January 19 – Rex Ingamells (died 1955), Australian
 February 10 – Charles Henri Ford (died 2002), American novelist, poet, filmmaker, photographer, and collage artist
 February 26 – George Barker (died 1991), English poet and author
 February 28 – Virginia Hamilton Adair, (died 2004), American poet
 March 4 – Sadako Kurihara 栗原貞子 (died 2005), poet who survives the Hiroshima nuclear holocaust and became known for her poems about her city
 March 16 – Carmelo Arden Quin, (died 2010), Uruguayan poet, political writer, painter, sculptor and co-founder of the international artistic movement “Madi”
 March 29 – R. S. Thomas (died 2000), Anglo-Welsh poet
 May 6 – Douglas Stewart (died 1985), Australian
 June 24 – Vincent Ferrini (died 2007), American writer and poet
 June 26 – Aimé Césaire (died 2008), Martinican Francophone poet, writer and politician
 July 10 – Salvador Espriu (died 1985), Spanish Catalan
 July 30 – John Blight (died 1995), Australian
 August 4 – Robert Hayden (died 1980), American poet, essayist, educator and Poet Laureate Consultant in Poetry to the Library of Congress
 September 16 – Dinesh Das (died 1985), Indian, Bengali-language
 September 25 – Seaforth Mackenzie (died 1955), Australian
 November 10 – Karl Shapiro  died 2000), American
 December 7 (November 24 O.S.) – Kersti Merilaas, born Eugenia Moorberg (died 1986), Estonian
 December 8 – Delmore Schwartz (died 1966), American poet and short-story writer
 December 15 – Muriel Rukeyser (died 1980), American poet and political activist
 December 27 – Elizabeth Smart (died 1986), Canadian poet and novelist
 Also:
 Appan M. A., Indian, Malayalam-language
 James Boughton, American poet
 Flexmore Hudson (died 1988), Australian
 V. R. Kant (died 1990), Indian, Marathi-language
 Bhatt Damodar Kesavaji, pen name Sudhansu (died 1983), Indian, Gujarati-language
 Devandas Kishinani, "Azad", Indian, Sindhi-language
 Ananta Pattanayak, Indian, Oriya-language 
 Bal Krisna Rav (died 1974), Indian, Hindi-language poet, editor and translator; edited the monthly ' 'Kadambini' '
 Harumal Isardas Sadarangani, "Khadim", Indian, Sindhi-language poet and scholar
 Upendra Thakur, "Mohan" (died 1980), Indian, Oriya-language 

Deaths
Birth years link to the corresponding "[year] in poetry" article:
 February 17 – Joaquin Miller (born 1837), American "Poet of the Sierras"
 March 7 – Pauline Johnson, also known as "E. Payuline Johnson" and "Tekahionwake" (born 1861), Canadian known for poems and performances celebrating her aboriginal heritage, including the frequently anthologized "The Song My Paddle Sings"
 May 17 – Dwijendralal Ray (born 1863), Indian, Bengali-language poet, playwright and musician known primarily for patriotic plays and songs as well as Hindu devotional lyrics
 June 2 – Alfred Austin (born 1835), English Poet Laureate of the United Kingdom
 June 29 – Martina Swafford (born 1845), American poet
 July 30 – Itō Sachio 伊藤佐千夫, pen name of Itō Kojirō (born 1864), Meiji period tanka poet and novelist
 August 1 (January 19 O.S.) – Lesya Ukrainka (born 1871), Ukrainian
 September 2 – Lucy H. Washington (born 1835), American poet and social reformer
 December 1 (November 18 O.S.) – Juhan Liiv (born 1864), Estonian
 December 5 – Ferdinand Dugué (born 1816), French poet and playwright
 Also:
 Bhuban Chandra Barua pen name "Umesh Chandra Barua", (birth year uncertain, possibly 1890), Indian, Assamese-language poet
 Kunjikuttan Thampuran (born 1865), Indian, Malayalam-language poet associated with the Kodungalloor School of poetry

Awards and honors
 Nobel Prize in Literature: Rabindranath Tagore, partly for Gitanjali Newdigate Prize: Roy Ridley, Oxford Robert Bridges becomes British Poet Laureate

See also
 List of years in poetry
 Ego-Futurism movement in Russian poetry
 Dymock poets
 Expressionism movement in German poetry
 Russian Futurism
 Silver Age of Russian Poetry

 Young Poland (Polish: Młoda Polska'') modernist period in Polish  arts and literature
 Poetry

Notes

Poetry
20th-century poetry